Alan Haycock was a Canadian football player who played for the Winnipeg Blue Bombers. He won the Grey Cup with them in 1939.

References

Canadian football running backs
Winnipeg Blue Bombers players
Year of birth missing
Possibly living people